The Plantagenet Bank is an under-sea feature in the Atlantic Ocean about  southwest of Bermuda.

The site was the home of the Argus Island research tower until May of 1976. The tower hosted several oceanographic research studies in the area focusing on currents.

The bank has significant carbonate deposits. It was studied in the early 1960s for its magnetic deviations which contribute to the lore of the Bermuda Triangle.

References

Bibliography 
 

Undersea banks of the Atlantic Ocean